FC Neftyanik Yaroslavl (FC Yaroslavl Oilers) is a Russian football team from Yaroslavl. Established in 1963 as amateur club. It played professionally from 1994 to 2002. Their best result was 8th place in Zone West of the Russian Second Division in 2000. After 2002 it plays in the Yaroslavl city league. 2007, 2010, 2011, 2013, 2015, 2016, 2017 it was champion of Yaroslavl.

External links
  Team history at KLISF
  Unofficial Fan-Site
  Amateur football of Yaroslavl
  Photos of the FC Neftyanik in the Yaroslavl city league 2010
  Photos of the FC Neftyanik in the Yaroslavl city league 2010

Association football clubs established in 1963
Sport in Yaroslavl
1963 establishments in Russia